In topology and related areas of mathematics, a neighbourhood (or neighborhood) is one of the basic concepts in a topological space. It is closely related to the concepts of open set and interior. Intuitively speaking, a neighbourhood of a point is a set of points containing that point where one can move some amount in any direction away from that point without leaving the set.

Definitions

Neighbourhood of a point

Some authors have been known to require neighbourhoods to be open, so it is important to note conventions.

A set that is a neighbourhood of each of its points is open since it can be expressed as the union of open sets containing each of its points. A closed rectangle, as illustrated in the figure, is not a neighbourhood of all its points; points on the edges or corners of the rectangle are not contained in any open set that is contained within the rectangle.

The collection of all neighbourhoods of a point is called the neighbourhood system at the point.

Neighbourhood of a set

The neighbourhood of a point is just a special case of this definition.

In a metric space

In a metric space  a set  is a neighbourhood of a point  if there exists an open ball with center  and radius  such that

is contained in 

 is called uniform neighbourhood of a set  if there exists a positive number  such that for all elements  of 

is contained in 

It directly follows that an -neighbourhood is a uniform neighbourhood, and that a set is a uniform neighbourhood if and only if it contains an -neighbourhood for some value of

Examples

Given the set of real numbers  with the usual Euclidean metric and a subset  defined as

then  is a neighbourhood for the set  of natural numbers, but is  a uniform neighbourhood of this set.

Topology from neighbourhoods

The above definition is useful if the notion of open set is already defined. There is an alternative way to define a topology, by first defining the neighbourhood system, and then open sets as those sets containing a neighbourhood of each of their points.

 the point  is an element of each  in 

One can show that both definitions are compatible, that is, the topology obtained from the neighbourhood system defined using open sets is the original one, and vice versa when starting out from a neighbourhood system.

Uniform neighbourhoods

In a uniform space   is called a uniform neighbourhood of  if there exists an entourage  such that  contains all points of  that are -close to some point of  that is,  for all

Deleted neighbourhood

The concept of deleted neighbourhood occurs in the definition of the limit of a function and in the definition of limit points (among other things).

See also

References

General topology
Mathematical analysis